Dashtak may refer to:

Dashtak, Afghanistan
Dashtak, Chaharmahal and Bakhtiari, Iran
Dashtak, Kavar, Fars Province, Iran
Dashtak, Marvdasht, Fars Province, Iran
Dashtak, Gilan, Iran
Dashtak, Pataveh, Dana County, Kohgiluyeh and Boyer-Ahmad Province, Iran
Dashtak Dishmuk, Kohgiluyeh and Boyer-Ahmad Province, Iran
Dashtak, Qazvin, Iran
Dashtak, South Khorasan, Iran
Dashtaki District, in West Azerbaijan Province, Iran
Dashtak-e Olya (disambiguation), several places in Iran
Dashtak-e Sofla (disambiguation), several places in Iran

See also
Dashtuk (disambiguation)